Ceroxys latiusculus, or the narrow-banded picture-winged fly, is a species of ulidiid or picture-winged fly in the genus Ceroxys of the family Ulidiidae. Adults are 9-12 mm in length. The abdomen is black with gray bands and the wings have distinctive markings. Larvae feed on Senecio.

References

latiusculus
Insects described in 1873